Luby may refer to:

People
Gloria Lindsay Luby, Canadian politician
Kia Luby, Australian actress and television presenter
Kurt Luby, British auto racing driver
Michael Luby, American mathematician and computer scientist
Pat Luby, American baseball player
Thomas Clarke Luby, Irish revolutionary and author

Places
 Luby (Cheb District), a town in the Czech Republic

See also
 Łuby (disambiguation), Polish placenames